is a Japanese actor. He is known for the Japanese voice of Aladdin in the 2019 live action remake.

Career
Nakamura made his debut in the film The Innocent Seven in 2005.

Filmography

Film

Television

Japanese dub

Awards

References

External links
 Official Site 

1986 births
Japanese male film actors
Japanese male television actors
Living people
Male actors from Tokyo
21st-century Japanese male actors